Newcourt may refer to:
 Richard Newcourt (cartographer) (died 1679)
 Richard Newcourt (historian) (died 1716) 
 Newcourt (County Cork) railway station, Ireland
 Newcourt, Exeter, England
 Newcourt (Exeter) railway station, England
 Irishtown, Kilkenny, AKA manor of Newcourt or borough of St Canice's

See also
 New Court (disambiguation)